The Diamond Match Company has its roots in several nineteenth century companies. In the early 1850s, Edward Tatnall of Wilmington, Delaware was given an English recipe for making matches by a business acquaintance, William R. Smith. In 1853, Tatnall attempted to turn the recipe into a business at Market Street Bridge over Brandywine Creek in Wilmington. The first matches ignited with the slightest friction, a problem Tatnall solved by reducing the phosphorus content by 25 percent.

Company background
In the next few years, Tatnall was joined by a young Englishman, Henry Coughtrey, who was an experienced match maker, and who changed his name to Courtney. During a business depression in 1857, Tatnall closed his plant, but Courtney continued to experiment with improvements to the safety and quality of his own matches. In 1860, William H. Swift joined Tatnall’s firm to provide clerical and financial services. Though Swift saw potential in Courtney’s innovations, Tatnall felt he had spent enough on the match business and turned the business over to Courtney and Swift for nothing. In 1861, the two of them created the Swift & Courtney Company. They called their new matches Diamond State Parlor Matches, using one of the popular nicknames for the state of Delaware.

Demand during the Civil War created a large and growing market for Swift & Courtney matches. In order to meet an expanding need for production even after the Civil War, the company merged with Beecher & Sons of New Haven, Connecticut in 1870 to create the Swift & Courtney & Beecher Company. Incorporated in Connecticut, manufacturing remained in Wilmington, Delaware. Later in 1870, the company purchased the match business of Thomas Allen & Company of St. Louis, Missouri. In 1872, they bought McGiugan & Daily of Philadelphia, and made contracts with Joseph Loehy of New York City and Charles Busch of Trenton, New Jersey.

In 1880, everything was sold to the Barber Match Company of Akron, Ohio, founded by O.C. Barber.  Barber re-named the company after the established trade name of its product, creating the Diamond Match Company.  Following the Panic of 1893, Barber moved the Diamond Match Company factory in Akron to the adjacent town of his own creation, Barberton in an effort to revive the town's flagging economy.  He turned the abandoned Akron match factory into a rubber products factory (see Diamond Rubber Company).

The Diamond Match Company was the largest manufacturer of matches in the United States in the late nineteenth century.

It became a part of the Kreuger concern in 1932, when Ivar Kreuger took control of more than 52% of the shares.

The Diamond Match Company operated plants at Barberton, Ohio; Wilmington, Delaware (now located in the East Brandywine Historic District); Barber, California (later Chico); Springfield, Massachusetts; Oshkosh, Wisconsin; Oswego, New York, and Cloquet, Minnesota.

Diamond was purchased by Jarden in 2003 after entering bankruptcy in 2001, and has been owned by Newell Brands since Newell Rubbermaid's acquisition of the company in a merger in 2016. In 2017, Newell sold Diamond (except the cutlery line) to Royal Oak Enterprises. In the twenty-first century, Diamond remains America's leading producer of matches, producing some twelve billion a year. It also produces plastic cutlery and other wood products.

California railroads

The Diamond Match Company built a wood processing mill in 1902 at Stirling City, California. A  standard gauge railroad was built from Stirling City to their manufacturing plant in Chico for operation by Southern Pacific; and Diamond Match Company also built and operated metre-gauge railway branches to bring logs into Stirling City from surrounding forests. The company became a pioneering user of treated railroad ties by building a tie-manufacturing plant at Stirling City. Later, logging branches were built to standard gauge; and the company was operating three Lima Locomotive Works Shay locomotives and one built by Willamette Iron and Steel Works when the logging branches were abandoned in 1952.

Diamond Match Company also built an electrified tram line to transport employees to and from work. The Chico Electric Railway running along 9th Street and Main Street began operations in 1904, and became the northern terminus of the Sacramento Northern Railway in 1906.

References

External links 

 Official site

Chico, California
Companies based in Ohio
Manufacturing companies established in 1881
Defunct manufacturing companies based in Ohio
Defunct forest products companies of the United States
History of Butte County, California
Matches (firelighting)
American companies established in 1881
Companies that filed for Chapter 11 bankruptcy in 2001
2003 mergers and acquisitions
2016 mergers and acquisitions
2017 mergers and acquisitions